Enna is a genus of South American and Central American araneomorph spiders in the family Trechaleidae, first described by Octavius Pickard-Cambridge in 1897.

Species
Enna contains forty described species:
Enna baeza Silva, Lise & Carico, 2008 — Ecuador, Peru
Enna bartica Silva, Lise & Carico, 2008 — Brazil, Guyana
Enna bonaldoi Silva, Lise & Carico, 2008 — Peru, Brazil
Enna caliensis Silva, Lise & Carico, 2008 — Colombia, Bolivia
Enna caparao Silva & Lise, 2009 — Brazil
Enna caricoi Silva & Lise, 2011 — Colombia
Enna carinata Silva & Lise, 2011 — Panama
Enna chickeringi Silva, Lise & Carico, 2008 — Honduras, Costa Rica
Enna colonche Silva, Lise & Carico, 2008 — Ecuador
Enna eberhardi Silva, Lise & Carico, 2008 — Costa Rica, Panama
Enna echarate Silva & Lise, 2009 — Peru
Enna estebanensis (Simon, 1898) — Venezuela, Ecuador
Enna frijoles Silva & Lise, 2011 — Panama
Enna gloriae  —Colombia
Enna hara Silva, Lise & Carico, 2008 — Peru
Enna huanuco Silva, Lise & Carico, 2008 — Peru
Enna igarape Silva, Lise & Carico, 2008 — Peru, Brazil
Enna jullieni (Simon, 1898) — Panama, Colombia, Venezuela
Enna junin (Carico & Silva, 2010) — Peru
Enna kuyuwiniensis Silva, Lise & Carico, 2008 — Guyana
Enna maya Silva, Lise & Carico, 2008 — Honduras, Costa Rica, Peru
Enna meridionalis Silva & Lise, 2009 — Brazil
Enna minor Petrunkevitch, 1925 — Panama, Colombia
Enna moyobamba Silva, Víquez & Lise, 2012 — Peru
Enna nesiotes Chamberlin, 1925 — Panama
Enna osaensis Silva, Víquez & Lise, 2012 — Costa Rica
Enna paraensis Silva, Lise & Carico, 2008 — Brazil
Enna pecki Silva, Lise & Carico, 2008 — Costa Rica
Enna redundans (Platnick, 1993) — Brazil
Enna rioja Silva, 2013 — Peru
Enna riotopo Silva, Lise & Carico, 2008 — Ecuador
Enna rothi Silva, Lise & Carico, 2008 — Ecuador
Enna segredo Silva & Lise, 2009 — Brazil
Enna silvae Silva & Lise, 2011 — Peru
Enna triste Silva & Lise, 2011 — Venezuela
Enna trivittata Silva & Lise, 2009 — Peru, Brazil
Enna velox O. Pickard-Cambridge, 1897 — Mexico
Enna venezuelana Silva & Lise, 2011 — Venezuela
Enna xingu Carico & Silva, 2010 — Brazil
Enna zurqui Silva & Lise, 2011 — Costa Rica

References

External links

Araneomorphae genera
Trechaleidae